William Coventre (died c. 1445) was an English politician.

Coventre was a Member of Parliament for Devizes in November 1414, 1415, 1417, May 1421, 1422, 1423, 1426, 1427 and 1433.

He was probably the son of William Coventre I.

References

Year of birth missing
1440s deaths
14th-century births
English MPs November 1414
People from Devizes
English MPs 1415
English MPs 1417
English MPs May 1421
English MPs 1422
English MPs 1423
English MPs 1426
English MPs 1427
English MPs 1433